Hodiș may refer to several villages in Romania:

 Hodiș, a village in Bârsa Commune, Arad County
 Hodiș, a village in Holod Commune, Bihor County
 Hodiș (river), a river in Arad County